Alvøyna or Alvøy is an island in Øygarden municipality in Vestland county, Norway. The  island is located west of the Hjeltefjorden and it had a population of 760 inhabitants in 2001.  It sits just north of the island of Ona and just south of the island of Seløyna. The Sture Terminal, endpoint of the Oseberg Transport System, was established here in 1988.  The village of Alveim is located on the west side of the island and the village of Tjeldstø lies on the eastern shore.

References

Islands of Vestland
Øygarden